is a Japanese sprint canoer who competed in the mid-2000s. At the 2004 Summer Olympics in Athens, she was eliminated in the semifinals of the K-1 500 m event.

External links
Sports-Reference.com profile

1984 births
Canoeists at the 2004 Summer Olympics
Japanese female canoeists
Living people
Olympic canoeists of Japan